Jenny Smith (born 31 March 1980) is an Australian gymnast.  She competed at the 1996 Summer Olympics.

References

External links
 

1980 births
Living people
Australian female artistic gymnasts
Olympic gymnasts of Australia
Gymnasts at the 1996 Summer Olympics
Sportspeople from Perth, Western Australia